Dimitrie N. Marinescu (1882–1916) was a Romanian typographer, socialist and pacifist. He was a founder and General Secretary of the first Social Democratic Party of Romania in 1910.

Biography 
Marinescu wrote several books but only two were published. In 1915 he translated and published a Wilhelm Lamszus book from 1912 titled The human slaughterhouse. Images of the coming war. Next year he died in war at age 34.

A biographical book for Marinescu's life Evocari - Dimitrie Marinescu was written by Constantin Pirvulescu and Georgeta Tudoran. Editura Politica published it in Bucharest in 1971

A street in Bucharest is named Dimitrie Marinescu in his honour.

Bibliography
Marinescu's books are kept by the Romanian Academy Library:

 34887. ~ Câte-va cuvinte asupra Socialismului şi Sindicalismului în România, [de] D. N. Marinescu (Lucrător). Cu o prefaţă de Const. Gheorghian. București (Speranţa, Inst. de Arte Grafice), 1911. (21,5 x 13,5). 24 p. 25 bani. (II 27522) Fără copertă.
 34888. ~ Treizeci zile la Văcăreşti. Fapte şi impressii (Epilogul înscenărei poliţieneşti de la 9 Ocotombrie 1909), [de] D. Marinescu. București, Cercul de Editură Socialistă (Tipografia Cooperativă Poporul), 1910. (16,5 x 12,5). 54 p. 15 bani. (Biblioteca România Muncitoare, nr. 25) (I 21632) Tipografia, pe cop. 4.
 31333. ~ Abatorul de Oameni. Tablouri din războiul viitor, [de] Wihelm Lamszus. Tradus de Dimitrie Marinescu. București (Tip. Soc. Anonime Poporul), 1914. (18,5 x 12). 64 p. (I 42410)
 (Wilhelm Lamszus - Das Menschenschlachthaus. Bilder vom kommenden Krieg (The human slaughterhouse. Images of the coming war) - 1912 - translation to Romanian )

References
Jos Războiul ! București, 1915. 
Pace şi neutralitate. București, 1915. 
Partidul Social-Democrat din România. București, 1915.

Social Democratic Party of Romania (1910–1918) politicians
Romanian military personnel killed in World War I
Romanian trade unionists
1882 births
1916 deaths